The Chropi Rifle was an assault rifle built by Chropi, Hropi, a Greek chemicals company, which used the "Chropi" spelling on its weapons. It was designed by a team under Sotiris Sofianopoulos and was proposed to the Greek Army in 1975. It was a simple and rather outdated design, clearly inferior to the Heckler & Koch G3, which was adopted (produced by the state run EVO company). The rifle was rejected after a series of tests indicated that the weapon itself did not adhere to all of the desired standards. The company, nonetheless, had created all necessary infrastructure for the rifle's production and a small number were manufactured and delivered to the Greek Army but these ended up being kept in storage facilities.

See also

 List of assault rifles

Bibliography

 

Rifles of the Cold War
7.62×39mm assault rifles
Trial and research firearms
Rifles of Greece